Siah Siah (also Romanized as Sīāh Sīāh) is a village in Vizhenan Rural District, in the Central District of Gilan-e Gharb County, Kermanshah Province, Iran. At the 2006 census, its population was 49, in 10 families.

References 

Populated places in Gilan-e Gharb County